Lubavitch Youth Organization (LYO) is an organization run by Chabad, a Jewish, Hasidic movement. The organization offers a range of services for Jews of all affiliations. LYO was established by Chabad rebbe, Rabbi Menachem Mendel Schneerson in 1955.

Administration
Chairman: Rabbi Dovid Raskin (d. 2011).
Director: Rabbi Shmuel M. Butman.

Services
Services provided by the organization include reciting Kaddish for the Jewish deceased and a community library.

References

Chabad organizations
Jewish organizations established in 1955